Farrokhabad (also Romanized as Farrokhābād) is a village in Esmaili Rural District, Esmaili District, Anbarabad County, Kerman Province, Iran. At the 2006 census, its population was 223, in 46 families.

References 

Populated places in Anbarabad County